Anne Hessing Cahn is a political author who holds a doctorate in political science from MIT.   She was notable for her criticism of the CIA among other US agencies and leaders, particularly Team B and other aspects of the last days of the Cold War.

Biography
Cahn was Scholar in Residence at The American University.  She served the US Government as Chief of the Social Impact Staff at the Arms Control and Disarmament Agency (1977–81), Special Assistant to the Deputy Assistant Secretary of Defense (1980–81), and president and executive director of the Committee for National Security (1982–88).  In 2001 she chaired the board of directors, for 20/20 Vision, a private organization founded to "increase citizen participation in public policy decisions on energy, security and the environment." She was also on the board of directors for the United States Institute of Peace or USIP, established in 1984, which is an independent, nonpartisan, national institution established and funded by the United States Congress.

Cahn was married to physicist John W. Cahn, who died in 2016.  She has three children (Martin Cahn, a physician in Seattle; Andy Cahn, a science teacher in Kenmore, Washington; and Lorie Cahn, an environmental scientist in Jackson, Wyoming), and six grandchildren.

Selected works
Eggheads and warheads: scientists and the ABM.  Anne Hessing Cahn. Cambridge, MA : Science and Public Policy Program, Dept. of Political Science and Center for International Studies, Mass. Institute of Technology, c1971. c1971.
The Future of the Sea-Based Deterrent by Anne H. Cahn, Bernard T. Feld Kosta Tsipis, The MIT Press (1974)
“Determinants of the Nuclear Option: The Case of Iran,” by Anne Hessing Cahn, in Onkar S. Marwah and Ann Schulz, eds., Nuclear Proliferation and the Near-Nuclear Countries (Cambridge, Mass.: Ballinger, 1975), pp. 185–204.
Lasers: For war and peace by Anne H. Cahn, Center for the Study of Armament and Disarmament, California State University (1975)
Controlling Future Arms Trade. Anne Hessing Cahn, Joseph Kruzel, Peter M. Dawkins and Jacques Huntzinger. McGraw-Hill (for the Council on Foreign Relations/1980s Project), 1977, 210 pp.  (see review at:  Foreign Affairs (magazine)
Tension Between Opposites: Reflections on the Practice and Theory of Politics, review by Anne Hessing Cahn, Bulletin of the Atomic Scientists,
Team B; The Trillion-dollar Experiment, Anne Hessing Cahn, Bulletin of the Atomic Scientists, April 1993, Volume 49, No. 03
Killing Détente: The Right Attacks the CIA. Anne Hessing Cahn. Pennsylvania State University Press, 1998  (see review at: Foreign Affairs (magazine)

References

External links
Penn State
Foreign Affairs (magazine)
democracyinaction.org re: 20/20 Vision (organization)
2020vision publication confirming position as Chair of BOD

1930 births
Living people
American political writers
United States Department of Defense officials